Moments of Fatherhood is an album by American jazz flautist Nicole Mitchell's Black Earth Ensemble with French contemporary music Ensemble Laborintus, which was recorded in 2015 and released on the French RogueArt label. The album is inspired by a collection of photographs that civil rights activist W.E.B. Du Bois put together for The Exhibit of American Negroes at the 1900 World's Exposition in Paris.

Reception
The All About Jazz review by John Sharpe states "By the end it's clear that Mitchell has created a highly imaginative tapestry in which composed and extemporized elements interweave to reflect not only the poignancy and humanity of the original photographic sources, but also their relevance to present-day existence."

Track listing
All compositions by Nicole Mitchell
 "Building Stuff" – 9:11
 "Cold Hard Facts" – 9:19
 "Explorers" – 12:53
 "Listening" – 12:06
 "Only One Like Him" – 7:15
 "A Place of Advice" – 7:55
 "Towards Excellence" – 5:43

Personnel
Nicole Mitchell - flutes
Renèe Baker – violin
David Boykin – tenor sax, clarinet
Aruán Ortiz – piano
Hélène Breschand – harp
Cèsar Carcopino – drums, vibraphone
Aruán Ortiz – piano
Benjamin Duboc – double bass
Sylvain Kassap – clarinets
Anaïs Moreau – cello

References

2016 albums
Nicole Mitchell (musician) albums
RogueArt albums